The Coquimbo Region is one of Chile's 16 regions (first order administrative divisions). It is bordered by Atacama to the north, Valparaíso to the south, Argentina to the east, and the Pacific Ocean to the west.

The capital and largest city is La Serena. Other important cities include the seaport Coquimbo and the agricultural centre Ovalle.

Geography and ecology

The Coquimbo Region forms the narrowest part, or 'waist' of Chile, and is hence one of the country's more mountainous regions, as the Andes range runs closer to the sea than elsewhere. The region has notable marine species as well as taxa that are associated with the mountainous regions. With respect to marine organisms, the upwelling areas encourage bioproductivity off of this Pacific Coast area of Chile.

In the southern mountainous areas of the Coquimbo Region, the rare and endangered Chilean Wine Palm is found, whose habitat is threatened by human population growth in the region and associated deforestation for residential expansion and agriculture.

The Elqui Valley is home to a number of astronomical observatories,  owing to the region's clear skies. It is also home to a 640-meter-long dam, the Puclaro, which confines the Elqui River and produces a reservoir containing 4,630,000 m³ of water for agricultural irrigation.

Demography
Mining and agricultural activities account for the location of various places in the region, around the transverse valleys and mineral deposits. Originally this organization was structured according to the location of Indian villages of the Diaguitas. A high percentage (70–75%) of inhabitants are of Mestizo (Euro-Amerindian) background, higher than any other region in Chile. Other indigenous peoples include the Aymara, Atacameno, Mapuche and Quechua, who were immigrants themselves from Peru and Bolivia.

Recent high population growth stresses the conurbation La Serena-Coquimbo (est. 300,000 or 297,253 inhabitants), which concentrates half the regional population. In terms of population, major cities are (according to the 2002 census): La Serena (148,815), Coquimbo (148,438), Ovalle (66,405), Illapel (21,826), Vicuña (12,910), Salamanca (11,615), and Los Vilos (10,966).

Economy
This region is a very popular travel destination. Visitors are mainly attracted to its long beaches, many of fine white sand, bathed by a calm sea, and the region's pleasant climate.

Along with tourism, the province's main industries are agriculture and fishing. The mountains are a center of astronomy in Chile.

Communications

Printed press
The first newspaper published in this region was El Minero de Coquimbo in 1828. In La Serena is published the newspaper El Día (founded on April 1, 1944) and the Weekly Tiempo (founded on 13 November 1993), while in the Coquimbo is printed La Región (founded on April 13, 2004) and the newspaper El Ovallino in Ovalle (founded on October 15, 1989).

TV
In television TVN Red Coquimbo began on June 28, 1993, news segments broadcast signal within the country. Then conduct small programs with reports in the local accent.

In cable television, there is CuartaVisión channel in the UHF signal cable 3 VTR and the TV signal 2 open Ovalle, transmitting content regional productions and local customs, traditions, sports, art, etc..

In Ovalle, the council passed on UHF channel 63 of the Cable Color Ovalle TV, originally called "Cultura Televisión." This channel will broadcast news and documentaries from Limarí.

And have now ceased to exist several regional signals as Telenorte launched in the 1960s, and had a studio in La Serena in 1993, which ended in 1998. The signal issued from Arica continued until 2001, when it was closed forever.
Another regional channel, now gone, was the Canal 8 UCV TV. Identified as a local affiliate signal UCV TV, received support from the Valparaíso station and, with great technical support, made soap operas and other shows. This channel in 1994 changed to signal the signal 9, until in 2002 finally closed its doors, leaving the memory of more than 25 years of history of local communications.

In La Serena and Coquimbo are captured the following TV signals open:

 TVN (4 VHF signal)
 Canal 13 (VHF signal 13)
 Megavisión (11 VHF signal)
 Chilevision (2 VHF signal)
 Red TV (VHF signal 7)
 UCV TV (9 VHF signal)
 Telecanal (5 VHF signal)

Notable people
Nobel Laureate poet Gabriela Mistral was a native of Vicuña, in the Elqui Valley, a Pisco-producing area.
The paediatrician and biochemist Hermann Niemeyer, one of the central figures in the development of biochemistry in Chile, was born in Ovalle in 1918

References

R.N. Gibson, R.J.A. Atkinson and J.D.M. Gordon (2007) Oceanography and Marine Biology: An Annual Review, CRC Press, 560 pages  
C. Michael Hogan (2008) Chilean Wine Palm: Jubaea chilensis, GlobalTwitcher.com, ed. Nicklas Stromberg

External links
 Gobierno Regional de Coquimbo Official website – archived 

 
Regions of Chile